Bae Dae-Won (born July 6, 1988) is a South Korean football player who currently plays for Gimhae FC.

Club statistics

References

External links

1988 births
Living people
South Korean footballers
South Korean expatriate footballers
Suwon Samsung Bluewings players
Tokyo Verdy players
FC Machida Zelvia players
K League 1 players
Korea National League players
J2 League players
J3 League players
Japan Football League players
South Korean expatriate sportspeople in Japan
Expatriate footballers in Japan
Hanyang University alumni
Association football defenders